An Informal History of the Hugos (subtitled A Personal Look Back at the Hugo Awards, 1953–2000 is a 2018 reference work on science fiction and fantasy written by Jo Walton. In it, she asks if the nominees for the Hugo Award for Best Novel were indeed the best five books of the year, using as reference shortlists from other awards in the genre. After looking at the first 48 years of the award and presenting essays on select nominees, Walton concludes that the Hugo has a 69% success rate. The book was well-received and was itself nominated for a Hugo Award in 2019. 

The chapters of the book initially appeared as articles on the magazine Tor.com from 2010 to 2011. These were written a year before Walton herself won the Hugo Award for Best Novel (for Among Others, in 2012). The Tor.com posts drew frequent discussion, with comments from editors Gardner Dozois, David G. Hartwell and Rich Horton that responded to and sometimes disagreed with Walton's analyses. These were included as part of the book.

Background
The impetus for the book came from the tie for the 2010 Hugo Award for Best Novel, when China Miéville and Paolo Bacigalupi both won the award. This was only the third time in 57 years that such a tie had happened, leading to a discussion on the fanzine File 770 about the previous two occasions:

Mike Glyer opined in an editorial that history had broken both prior ties, in favor of Connie Willis and Frank Herbert.  In reply, Walton said she was "absolutely astonished" at the suggestion.

Over the year following Glyer's post, Walton wrote a series of 49 articles on Tor.com titled Revisiting the Hugos (1953–2000). She argued in favor of the ties in 1966 and 1993, and analyzed nominees in a manner inspired by a 1990 Worldcon panel. Walton stopped at the year 2000, when she began to enter award eligibility herself. Her posts were later collected into book form and published in 2018.

Synopsis

Walton states in the introduction that her goal is to analyze whether the Hugo nominees were the best five books of the year, and to examine how well they have stood the test of time. Her focus is on novels, with occasional comments on other categories, including the Campbell nominees. The book contains a chapter for each year from 1953 to 2000.

For each year, Walton discusses the Hugo shortlist in context with other titles that might have been nominated. She considers finalists from the following awards for science fiction and fantasy:

After assessing the shortlist, she presents an essay about one book from each year. This is sometimes on the Hugo winner, but often about a different book Walton prefers. Since the Tor.com articles drew frequent discussion, sometimes garnering over 100 comments, the book contains a curated selection of the responses. It includes entries from Gardner Dozois, David G. Hartwell and Rich Horton that expand on the state of short fiction in each year.

In the conclusion, Walton notes that the Hugos got it right in twenty-nine out of forty-two years, or 69% of the time, for novels, but 99% for novellas.

Reception
Publishers Weekly called the book "an essential guide to 20th-century science fiction literature". PW remarked on Walton's substantial essays on individual books, a comment echoed by Gary K. Wolfe in his review for Locus Magazine. PW highlighted Walton's essay on Ursula K. Le Guin's The Lathe of Heaven, while Wolfe noted her entries on Robert Heinlein's Have Spacesuit, Will Travel, and Thomas M. Disch's On Wings of Song. Wolfe observed that the book looked at not just the nominees, but also at works that may have been overlooked for the Hugos, which he described as not an easy task.

Barnes & Nobles Jeff Somers commented on the personal nature of Walton's columns. He called the book "a singular, essential critical appreciation" for the Hugo nominees, and said that although they were pre-selected as some of the best SF ever written, "Walton doesn't always agree, and is more than ready to tell you why". Reviewers noted Walton's openness about her personal biases: for instance, she "adores much of Robert Heinlein and C. J. Cherryh", but dislikes Philip K. Dick and William Gibson. The candidness of Walton's opinions was praised by Publishers Weekly and Tor.coms Lee Mandelo. Mandelo called her approach refreshing, and remarked that "objectivity is more fantastical than dragons".

Reviewers also noted the extensive nature of contributions from Gardner Dozois, David G Hartwell and Rich Horton.  Wolfe wrote: "the book [is] virtually a collaboration... a good part of the fun of reading these columns all in one place is arguing with [Walton's] judgments, as her respondents often do with grace and good humor". Mandelo's review highlighted the transformation from conversational blog posts to a static book, and noted the uniqueness of the cross-platform approach, saying that it made for "a dragonfly-in-amber effect on reading".

An Informal History of the Hugos was a finalist for the 2019 Hugo Award for Best Related Work, and the 2019 Locus Award for Best Non-Fiction.

Notes

References

External links
 
 Revisiting the Hugos (Tor.com series)

Science fiction studies
Science fiction books
Fantasy books
2018 non-fiction books
Tor Books books